The RKO Boston Theatre was a movie theatre in Boston, Massachusetts,  located at 616 Washington Street, near Essex Street in the Boston Theater District. It opened as the Keith-Albee Boston Theatre on October 5, 1925.

History
The building had originally housed the Henry Siegel Co. department store. The theater section was designed by Thomas W. Lamb as part the Keith-Albee-Orpheum chain of vaudeville theatres. Keith-Albee-Orpheum became part of RKO Pictures in 1928, leading to the theater's renaming. 

During this time it featured film, big band concerts, and variety theatre performances. Musicians Benny Goodman, Tommy Dorsey, Glenn Miller and others frequently played the theater. A typical show would be preceded by a Class B movie, newsreel and coming attractions. Later, it was used for major event pictures using the latest technologies, such as Cinerama. By the 1970s the theatre was multiplexed, and was called "The Essex", an exploitation movie house.

References

Further reading
 Andrea Shea and David Boeri. "Reclaiming The Glory Of Washington Street’s Past." WBUR, December 21, 2010 (interview with Fred Taylor, who frequented the RKO Theatre in the 1940s)

External links

 Flickr. Milton Berle, Jolly Gillette (Eileen Barton), Al Frazzini, Nat Madison, RKO-Boston Theatre, September 23, 1937.
 Library of Congress. Drawing of Keith Albee New Bijou Theatre, Washington and Essex Streets, Boston, Massachusetts, 1927 (later the RKO-Boston)
 Flickr. RKO Keith-Boston Theatre, Boston, MA - 1933
 Flickr. RKO Keith-Boston Theatre, Boston, MA - 1935
 Flickr. RKO Keith Boston, 614 Washington Street, Boston, MA, 1944
 Flickr. Cinerama matchbook, ca.1950s (formerly the RKO-Boston)
 Bostonian Society:
 Postcard of Washington Street, ca. 1930-1945, showing sign "RKO Keith Boston"
 Photo of 580-594 Washington Street, ca. 1958 (Cinerama at right; formerly the RKO-Boston)

1925 establishments in Massachusetts
1970s disestablishments
Cultural history of Boston
20th century in Boston
Boston Theater District
Former theatres in Boston
Former cinemas in the United States
Music venues in Boston